Spirit of Wonder is a Japanese anthology manga series written and illustrated by Kenji Tsuruta. It was serialized in Kodansha's seinen manga magazines Morning and Monthly Afternoon from 1986 to 1995. A single-episode original video animation (OVA) animated by Ajia-do Animation Works and released by Toshiba-EMI, Spirit of Wonder: Miss China's Ring, was released in 1992. Another five-episode OVA was produced and released by Bandai Visual from 2001 to 2004.

Overview
Spirit of Wonder consists of self-contained short stories, whose common factor is that they revolve around scientists developing absurd inventions, with plots involving treasure hunting, time travel or space travel. The stories are inspired by science fiction authors like H. G. Wells, Jules Verne, and Edmond Hamilton. The title was inspired by the Spirit of St. Louis aircraft, flown by Charles Lindbergh on the first solo nonstop transatlantic flight. The first nine chapters, which were published in Weekly Morning, feature different protagonists, times, and places, while the last three chapters, which were published in Monthly Afternoon, feature the only recurrent protagonist, Miss China.

Media

Manga
Written and illustrated by Kenji Tsuruta, Spirit of Wonder was irregularly published for 12 chapters (including a pilot chapter) in Kodansha's seinen manga magazines Weekly Morning (and its special editions) and Monthly Afternoon from 1986 to 1995. Kodansha released a collected volume (numbered as first) on March 23, 1988, under the title The Spirit of Wonder; years later, when the series was finished, a single 407-page wideban volume, which collected the twelve chapters, was released on August 22, 1997.

In North America, Dark Horse Comics and Studio Proteus partially published the series in five issues (only publishing the Miss China stories), from April 1, 1996, to August 1, 1996; they were later collected in a single 152-page volume on June 24, 1998.

Chapter list

Original video animations

Miss China's Ring
An original video animation (OVA) episode, animated by Ajia-do Animation Works and released by Toshiba-EMI, titled , was released on June 3, 1992. In North America, the first OVA was licensed by AnimEigo and released on LaserDisc in February 1996; they later released it on DVD on January 10, 2001; however, three months later, AnimeEigo announced that it would go out of print.

2001 OVA
Another four-episode OVA was produced and distributed by Bandai Visual. Two DVDs were released on January 25 and July 25, 2001. A "Wonder Box" DVD box set, which included the 1992 OVA, the four-episode OVA, and an exclusive short, was released on January 23, 2004. In North America, the four-episode OVA was licensed by Bandai Entertainment; it was released on September 16, 2003. In Europe, it was released by Beez Entertainment; unlike the other English releases, it included the "Miss China's Sakazuki" short (English-subbed only). In Australia and New Zealand, the OVA was released by Madman Entertainment on June 21, 2006.

Reception

Manga
Reviewing the Dark Horse edition, which only included the Miss China chapters, Eugene Cheng of EX made positive comments about the series, praising its "beautiful art", "unique style", "delightful characters and charming story", lauding as well Tsuruta's artwork and his "skillful use of scenery, perspective, and contrast", ultimately calling the series: "easily one of the best manga currently available in America." Manga critic Jason Thompson commented that "its detailed artwork makes this manga live up to its name: a sweet if unresolved love story, similar to the comics of Kozue Amano (Aqua, Aria), in which the characters often stop and gaze at the scenery," and called the Miss China stories "[e]njoyable but slight, with no real ending." Kevin Pezzano of SciFi.com called Tsuruta's artwork "simply breathtaking, with incredibly detailed and complex lines that nevertheless are very clear"; however, he called the story "[not] quite as good as the art", "little unclear," and that it can be "safely forgotten." He also criticized the fanservice, noting: "at times it seems that there are more panty shot panels than story panels." Pezzano concluded: "if you pick this manga up, just let the art and concepts wash over you, and try not to get offended at Miss China's outrageously lame accent." Mariela Ortiz of the same website also praised the artwork, commenting: "[e]ach page is drawn with painstaking attention to detail, you can't just read the words to understand the story." Ortiz criticized the fanservice as well, commenting, however, that "[it] is to be expected in this genre."

Reviewing the entire manga, Mario Vuk of Splash Comics enjoyed the anthological format of the series and highlighted Tsuruta's hatching technique, which makes the art look "classic," and called his artwork: "very appealing and rich in detail." Vuk also called it "simply a beautiful work with classic charm and a not excessive amount of comedy." A pity."

Miss China's Ring
Christopher Macdonald of Anime News Network (ANN) said that Miss China's Ring is "quite simply, is unique, and very weird; but also very fun. Macdonald commented that Tsuruta's original character designs and artwork were "nicely  by good animation" in the OVA, and recommended it to "any one who is looking for a nice, short, heartwarming story devoid of any heavy material," noting however that "anyone looking for a movie with strong, complicated plot, or overwhelming emotions, will probably be disappointed by Spirit of Wonder." Mariela Ortiz of Scifi.com said that the characters, particularly Miss China, "come off as stereotypical," "with her accent and fighting skills", adding, however, that it "does not detract from the story." Ortiz called the OVA a "funny and heartwarming tale, and an enjoyable anime." Shu-Chun Lin of the same website called it "a lovely and cute love story," adding that while the story is not complicated, "it is very enjoyable and entertaining. It is very sweet and lovely anime you may like to see and experience that warm and sweet feeling on your own."

Mike Toole of Anime Jump described it as "a nice break from the tidal wave of action and comedy fare flooding the market," but also called it "surprisingly insubstantial," expressing that "one wishes that there was a little more meat to the story." Chris Beveridge of AnimeOnDVD praised its animation, commenting that it was "nicely done with a few really nice sequences." Beveridge commented that he "enjoyed the heck out of this show", and concluded: "[i]t's not a show that everyone will be drawn to, but if you're looking for something a bit off the beaten path, this is something worth trying." Jim Lazar of the same website said that "the charming story revolves around Miss China's attraction to Jim and one of the doctor's amazing inventions." He also said that the story "isn't an epic tale, but it's very charming and keeps you interested throughout the short 45 minutes." Writing for Otaku USA, Paul Chapman commented that while. "[t]here’s nothing wrong" with the OVA, the title character is "something of a stereotype." Chapman said that the animation is "adequate though not spectacular," calling as well the color palette "soft and gentle, with a lot of muted pastels appropriate to the wistful, melancholy tone of the story." Chapman said that he did not particularly like the OVA, adding that "[i]t’s not bad, but it’s not outstanding, either."

Notes

References

External links
  
 

1986 manga
1992 anime OVAs
2001 anime OVAs
Ajia-do Animation Works
Bandai Visual
Dark Horse Comics titles
Kodansha manga
Seinen manga
Steampunk anime and manga